Diamond Standard is the producer of an exchange traded, regulated diamond commodity. Equivalent to a standard gold bar for the diamond market, the diamond coin and bar enable investors to access an estimated $1.2 trillion asset class for the first time. Futures contracts are in development by CFTC-licensees, and an investment trust launched in 2022.

The commodity makes diamonds accessible to fund managers because the commodity is marked-to-market daily. The coin and bar are physical, and each contains a standardized set of diamonds, graded and certified by the GIA. The diamonds are acquired using an automated market-making and statistical sampling process. The geological details of the diamonds is stored on a public blockchain. 

While the commodity is held by custodians, the asset is traded using a regulator-licensed blockchain token. The diamond coin and bar contain an embedded wireless encryption chip. The chip provides auditing and authentication, and stores the blockchain token, which can be transacted electronically and instantly.

The Diamond Standard Coin offerings are regulated by the Bermuda Monetary Authority and audited by Deloitte. The authenticity and fairness of the diamond commodity is ensured by full transparency regarding the contents, sourcing, and price discovery of the diamonds inside each commodity.

To supply the commodity, the company formed the Diamond Standard Exchange. All diamonds contained in the commodity are priced and acquired via transparent bidding on this exchange. 

The company was founded in New York City and has offices in Hamilton, Bermuda, the domicile of its regulator.

History
Founder Cormac Kinney is a software designer and serial entrepreneur.

Diamond Standard, and the Bitcarbon token, are among the first services to launch under Bermuda's recently enacted Digital Asset Business Act.

References

External links
 

Companies based in New York City